Ernie Pook's Comeek is an American underground comic/alternative comic by Lynda Barry.

It features the everyday lives of a young boy, Ernie Pook, and a young girl, Marlys Mullen. It was first published in 1979, without Barry's knowledge, by Matt Groening and John Keister in their respective college newspapers. While Barry has stated it wasn't autobiographical, it was loosely based on her own childhood years. It ran in over 70 alternative newspapers, such as the Chicago Reader.

It was discontinued in 2008. Drawn & Quarterly reissued a collection called The Greatest of Marlys in 2016 and is continuing to reissue collections.

Sources

American comics
1979 comics debuts
2008 comics endings
Underground comix
Male characters in comics
Child characters in comics
Slice of life comics